Standing for Something: 10 Neglected Virtues That Will Heal Our Hearts and Homes is a self-improvement book by Gordon B. Hinckley, the 15th president of the Church of Jesus Christ of Latter-day Saints. The foreword to the book was written by Emmy Award-winning journalist Mike Wallace, and it bears endorsements by William J. Bennett, Stephen R. Covey, and United States Senator Joe Lieberman.

The book became a New York Times Best Seller in 2000 in the "advice and how-to category," and it received the 2000 Devotional Award from the Association for Mormon Letters.

The book's ten virtues
Hinckley composed ten virtues:

 Virtue 1 - Love: The Lodestar of Life
 Virtue 2 - Where There Is Honesty, Other Virtues Will Follow
 Virtue 3 - Making a Case for Morality
 Virtue 4 - Our Fading Civility
 Virtue 5 - Learning: "With All Thy Getting, get Understanding"
 Virtue 6 - The Twin Virtues of Forgiveness and Mercy
 Virtue 7 - Thrift and Industry: Getting Our Houses in Order
 Virtue 8 - Gratitude: A Sign of Maturity
 Virtue 9 - Optimism in the Face of Cynicism
 Virtue 10 - Faith: Our Only Hope

References

Self-help books
LDS non-fiction
Random House books
2000 non-fiction books
2000 in Christianity
Books by Gordon B. Hinckley
Works by presidents of the church (LDS Church)